The RV Franklin is an oceanographic and hydrographic research vessel. She was operated by the Commonwealth Scientific and Industrial Research Organisation (CSIRO) as a national facility between 1985 and 2002.

References

1985 ships
Ships built in Queensland
Research vessels of Australia
CSIRO